Catherine Rayner is an Edinburgh-based British illustrator and writer of children's books. She was born in Harrogate in 1982, and grew up in Boston Spa, later studying at Leeds College of Art and Edinburgh College of Art.

She won the Kate Greenaway Medal in 2009 for Harris Finds his Feet, and has been shortlisted in 2007, 2011, 2012, 2015.

In 2014, Norris, The Bear Who Shared  was named by The Sunday Times as one of the 100 Children's Modern Classics of the past ten years.

Works

Writer and illustrator
 Augustus and his Smile, Little Tiger Press, 2006
 Harris Finds his Feet, Little Tiger Press, 2008 
 Sylvia and Bird, Little Tiger Press, 2009
 Ernest, Macmillan Children’s Books, 2009 
 Norris, The Bear who Shared, Orchard Books, 2010 
 Iris and Isaac, Little Tiger Press, 2010 
 Solomon Crocodile, Macmillan Children’s Books, 2011 
 Abigail, Little Tiger Press, 2013
 Smelly Louie, Macmillan Children’s Books, 2014 
  Solomon and Mortimer, Macmillan Children's Books 2016

Illustrator
 Posy, written by Linda Newberry, Orchard Books, 2008 
 The Tales of Olga Da Polga, written by Michael Bond, Oxford University Press, 2011 
 Gobbolino the Witch's Cat, written by Ursula Moray Williams, Macmillan, 2012 
 Tiger Tale, written by Holly Webb, Scholastic, 2014
 Clare and her Captain, written by Michael Morpurgo, published 2015

Awards

 2006 Winner – Best New Illustrator Award, Booktrust Early Year Awards, Augustus and his Smile
 2008 Winner – Booktrust Best New Illustrator Award 
 2009 Winner – CILIP Kate Greenaway Medal, Harris Finds His Feet
 2010 Winner – Top Ten New Illustrators 2000 – 2010 
 2010 Winner – The English Association English 4-11 Book Awards (Key Stage One Fiction), Ernest
 2011 Winner – Coventry Inspiration Book Awards, Ernest 
 2012 Winner – UKLA Children’s Book Award, Iris and Isaac
 2014 Winner – Picture Book of the Year in The Netherlands by the CPNB, Solomon Crocodile 
 2015 Winner – Peter's Book of the Year, Smelly Louie
 2021 Mathical Honors - One Happy Tiger

References

External links

 
 Facebook page
 
 Penheaven. Illustration: An Interview With Catherine Rayner
 Books For Keeps, May 2012. Authorgraph 194: Catherine Rayner
 Library Mice. BLOG TOUR: a Q & A with Catherine Rayner
 Author and illustrator Catherine Rayner on creating award-winning books for children 

1982 births
Living people
British children's book illustrators
British children's writers
Alumni of Leeds Arts University
Alumni of the Edinburgh College of Art
Kate Greenaway Medal winners
People from Harrogate
20th-century English women writers
20th-century English writers
21st-century English women writers
Date of birth missing (living people)